Campomanesia grandiflora is a species of tree the flowering plant family Myrtaceae. In Portuguese the species goes by the common name Acariquara branca.

The species has a self-supporting growth form and simple, ovate leaves.

Occurrence 
The species is native to Brazil, French Guiana, Guyana, Suriname, and Venezuela.

Uses 
The species is cultivated for food in its native land.

References 

grandiflora